Donavon Ferreira (born 21 July 1998) is a South African cricketer. He made his Twenty20 debut for Northerns in the 2018 Africa T20 Cup on 14 September 2018. He made his List A debut on 19 October 2019, for Northerns in the 2019–20 CSA Provincial One-Day Challenge. He made his first-class debut on 22 February 2021, for Easterns in the 2020–21 CSA 3-Day Provincial Cup.

Honours
 CSA T20 Challenge winner 2022–23 runner-up 2021–22
 CSA One-Day Cup runner up 2021–22

References

External links
 

1998 births
Living people
South African cricketers
Easterns cricketers
Northerns cricketers
Tshwane Spartans cricketers
Place of birth missing (living people)